Your Story Theatre (also known as Story Theater and Durkee Story Theater) is an American anthology television series that aired on the DuMont Television Network and on NBC. The DuMont series aired from November 4, 1950, to May 11, 1951, and the NBC series aired from June 24 to September 17, 1951.

The series was filmed at Hal Roach Studios and sponsored by Durkee Foods.

Cast
Actors appearing in the series included:
Julie Adams
Robert Alda
John Beal (actor)
Jan Clayton
Leif Erickson (actor)
William Frawley
Eva Gabor
Hugo Haas
Sterling Holloway
Marjorie Lord
Dan O'Herlihy
Gene Reynolds

Episode status
As with most DuMont series, no episodes are known to survive.

Bibliography
David Weinstein, The Forgotten Network: DuMont and the Birth of American Television (Philadelphia: Temple University Press, 2004) 
Alex McNeil, Total Television, Fourth edition (New York: Penguin Books, 1980) 
Tim Brooks and Earle Marsh, The Complete Directory to Prime Time Network TV Shows, Third edition (New York: Ballantine Books, 1964)

See also
List of programs broadcast by the DuMont Television Network
List of surviving DuMont Television Network broadcasts
1950-51 United States network television schedule

External links
 
Your Story Theatre at CTVA
DuMont historical website

1950 American television series debuts
1951 American television series endings
1950s American anthology television series
Black-and-white American television shows
DuMont Television Network original programming
English-language television shows
NBC original programming